These are the complete Grand Prix racing results for Scuderia Toro Rosso.

Complete Formula One results
(key)

Notes
† – The driver did not finish the Grand Prix, but was classified as he completed over 90% of the race distance.

References

Formula One constructor results